Byron Diman (August 5, 1795 – August 1, 1865) was an American politician who served as 19th Governor of Rhode Island.

Diman was born in Bristol, Rhode Island, on August 5, 1795. He worked in a counting-house for over two decades. He was then engaged in the whaling and mill businesses. He served in the Rhode Island Militia and later became Brigadier General. He became a member of the Rhode Island House of Representatives for many terms.

He became Lieutenant governor of Rhode Island for three years before winning election as the governor of Rhode Island. He was a Law and Order Party candidate. Although he did not win the majority of votes, he was selected as the governor of the state by the General Assembly. He held the governor's office from May 6, 1846, to May 4, 1847.

He later served in the Rhode Island State Senate for three years serving under Governors James Fenner and Charles Jackson. He was also active in organizing the Republican Party in Bristol. He died on August 1, 1865, and was buried in Juniper Hill Cemetery.

Sources 
 Sobel, Robert and John Raimo. Biographical Directory of the Governors of the United States, 1789-1978. Greenwood Press, 1988.

External links 

 Bio Sketch
 Diman Family Papers
 

1795 births
1865 deaths
Republican Party governors of Rhode Island
Lieutenant Governors of Rhode Island
People from Bristol, Rhode Island
Law and Order Party of Rhode Island state governors of the United States
Burials at Juniper Hill Cemetery
Republican Party members of the Rhode Island House of Representatives
Republican Party Rhode Island state senators
19th-century American politicians